Kristian Sprećaković  (born 12 June 1978) is a former German footballer of Serbian ancestry. He is a defensive midfielder.

Club career
Sprećaković played with 1. FC Schweinfurt 05 in the German 2. Bundesliga during the 2001-02 season. On 7 January 2008 Sprećaković arrived in Bulgaria to move to Cherno More Varna for a free transfer. He made his unofficial debut for Cherno More in a friendly match against Chernomorets Burgas on 23 January 2008. He played for 45 minutes. Cherno More won the match 2-0.

References

1978 births
Living people
Footballers from Saxony
German footballers
1. FC Schweinfurt 05 players
SV Darmstadt 98 players
SSV Reutlingen 05 players
SV Wehen Wiesbaden players
SV Elversberg players
People from Bautzen (district)
German people of Serbian descent
Expatriate footballers in Bulgaria
First Professional Football League (Bulgaria) players
PFC Cherno More Varna players
German expatriate footballers
Association football midfielders
German expatriate sportspeople in Bulgaria
2. Bundesliga players